Philippe Rochat (29 November 1953 – 8 July 2015) was a Swiss chef and the owner of the Restaurant de L'Hôtel de Ville in Crissier, Switzerland.

The restaurant, formerly owned by Frédy Girardet, won three Michelin Guide stars, and was voted 16th best in the world in Restaurant magazine's 50 Best Restaurants list in 2009.

Rochat's wife, marathon runner Franziska Rochat-Moser, died in 2002 in an avalanche.

Rochat died at the age of 61 on 8 July 2015. He fainted while riding his bicycle.

Citations

References
 Colman Andrews, "Swiss Hit. Saveur, 94.
 Elaine Khosrova, "Swiss Watch: On Hand with Philippe Rochat. Santé, June 2008.

External links
 Web site.
 Philippe Rochat, on the web site of the World's 50 best restaurants.

1953 births
Swiss chefs
Head chefs of Michelin starred restaurants
2015 deaths